France and New Zealand first met on 14 September 1996 in the Canada Cup, the Black Ferns trounced the French 109–0 in Edmonton. New Zealand won their next four encounters with three of them occurring in different Rugby World Cups — 2002, 2006 and 2010.

France registered their first win against the Black Ferns on 17 November 2018 at the Stade des Alpes in Grenoble. The Black Ferns then suffered three consecutive losses to the French in the following years, before recording a win in their fourth World Cup encounter in 2022.

Summary

Results

References

External links 

 Results Summary at stats.allblacks.com

France women's national rugby union team
New Zealand women's national rugby union team